Jürgen Carlos Gehrels FIET (born 24 July 1935) is a German businessman, and a former Chief Executive and Chairman of Siemens UK (Siemens Holdings plc).

Early life
He was the son of Dr Hans Gehrels and Ursula da Rocha. He attended the Technical University of Munich and the Technical University of Berlin.

Career

Siemens
From 1965-79 he worked for Siemens AG in Germany.

Siemens UK
He became Chief Executive of Siemens UK in 1986. In 1995 he was responsible for opening the Siemens Semiconductors plant on North Tyneside, a £1.1bn inward investment; the largest-ever inward investment in the UK. The plant was opened by the Queen in May 1997. The site is now the Cobalt Business Park, off the A19.

He left as Chairman of Siemens UK in September 2007. At the time, Siemens employed around 20,000 people in the UK, turning over around £3.5bn.

Personal life
He lives at Porlezza in Italy. He married Sigrid Kausch in 1963, and they had a son and a daughter. He is an Anglophile.

References

External links
 2005 photography
 Siemens UK

1935 births
Fellows of the Institution of Engineering and Technology
German chief executives
German electronics engineers
Siemens people
Technical University of Berlin alumni
Technical University of Munich alumni
Living people
Honorary Knights Commander of the Order of the British Empire